Patricia Lam (1941–1976) was a former Chinese actress from Hong Kong. Lam was credited with over 150 films. She has a star at the Avenue of Stars in Hong Kong.

Early life 
In 1941, Lam was born as Fung Suk Yin in Guangdong province, China. Lam attended Precious Blood Girls' School.

Career 
In 1948, Lam became a child actress in Hong Kong. She appeared in Underground Maze, a 1948 thriller film directed by Yam Wu-Fa. In 1957, at age 16, Lam joined Shaw Brothers Studio in Hong Kong. Lam's first Shaw Brothers film was The Fairy Sleeves, a 1957 Cantonese opera film directed by Chow Sze-Luk. Lam became a lead actress in many Hong Kong films. Lam is known for her sweet and innocent roles. Lam became a Shaw's Gem and known as the golden girl (aka Jade Girl). Lam had a fan club and its membership was peaked at 30,000 members. 
In 1967, Lam retired from acting. Lam's last Cantonese opera film was The Imperial Warrant, a 1968 film directed by Yang Fan. Lam is credited with over 150 films.

Filmography

Films 
This is a partial list of films.
 1948 Underground Maze 	 	 
 1957 The Fairy Sleeves 
 1957 The Marriage Between the Quick and the Dead 	 
 1958 A Pretty Girl's Love Affair 	 
 1958 A Virtuous Girl from a Humble House
 1958 Princess Jade Lotus – Princess King-Lin/Jade Lotus	
 1958 Sweet Girl in Terror – Lee Suk Kan 	
 1959 Young Rock – Dani Lau	
 1959 Love on the Lonely Bridge (aka Merdeka Bridge, Love on Merdeka Bridge) -Songstress Yim-mui. 
 1959 Glass Slippers 
 1960 Love and Chasity 
 1967 The Butterfly Legend
 1967 The Full Moon 
 1968 The Imperial Warrant

Awards 
 Star. Avenue of Stars. Tsim Sha Tsui waterfront in Hong Kong.

Personal life 
In 1967, Lam married. On August 28, 1976, Lam died.

References

External links 
 
 Patricia Lam Fung at Cinema Magic
 Patricia Lam Fung at hkmemory.hk
 Patricia Lam Fung with Chung Wai Ming at hkmemory.org
 Patricia Lam Fung at dianying.com
 Patricia Lam Fung at shaw.sg

1941 births
1976 deaths
Hong Kong film actresses